Oslo is a Tony award-winning play by J. T. Rogers, recounting (in dramatized, partially fictional form) the true-life, previously secret, back-channel negotiations in the development of the pivotal 1990s Oslo Peace Accords between Israel and the Palestinian Liberation Organization. The play premiered Off-Broadway in June 2016 and then transferred to Broadway in April 2017.

In May 2017, Oslo won the Lucille Lortel Award for Best Play, the Outer Critics Circle Award for Outstanding New Broadway Play, the 2017 Drama League Award for Outstanding Production of a Play, and two 2017 Obie Awards, one for Best New American Theater Work and the other an Ensemble Award (shared by the director and the entire Off-Broadway cast).

At the 71st Tony Awards, Oslo won the Tony Award for Best Play and Best Featured Actor in a Play award for Michael Aronov. It also won the 2017 Drama Desk Award for Outstanding Play and the 2016-2017 New York Drama Critics' Circle award for Best Play – for a sweep of the 2016-2017 awards season.

Overview
Oslo concerns the true story of the efforts of Mona Juul and her husband, Terje Rød-Larsen, who are diplomats from Norway, and who organized breakthrough negotiations between Israeli Prime Minister Yitzhak Rabin and Palestine Liberation Organization Chairman Yasser Arafat in 1993. The play runs for three hours.

Origins
The play originated from a chance connection between playwright J. T. Rogers and Norwegian diplomat Terje Rød-Larsen, through a mutual acquaintance (Rogers' director Bartlett Sher).  Through that mutual relationship, Rogers learned of the diplomat's unheralded work developing "back-channel" communications in the 1990s negotiations, and took an interest in developing the story into a play — noting that the story fit his playwriting interests: "stories ... framed against great political rupture ... [about people] who struggle with, and against ... [unfolding] world events — and who are [permanently changed] through that struggle."

Productions

Off-Broadway
Oslo was first developed at the PlayPenn New Play Conference in Philadelphia, PA. The world premiere production opened on July 11, 2016, at Lincoln Center Theater's Mitzi E. Newhouse Theater following previews from June 16. It was directed by Bartlett Sher.

The production starred Jennifer Ehle and Jefferson Mays. The cast also included Michael Aronov, Anthony Azizi, Adam Dannheisser, Daniel Jenkins, Dariush Kashani, Daniel Oreskes, Henny Russell, Joseph Siravo and T. Ryder Smith.

Broadway
Oslo transferred to Broadway and opened at the Vivian Beaumont Theater on April 13, 2017. Director Bartlett Sher as well as the entire original Off-Broadway cast reprised their roles in the Broadway production.

Of the new, larger production, Ben Brantley of The New York Times wrote that "J. T. Rogers’s Oslo, an against-the-odds story of international peacemaking, is undeniably a big play, as expansive and ambitious as any in recent Broadway history. So it is particularly gratifying to announce that it has been allowed to stretch to its full height in the thrilling production that opened on Thursday night, directed with a master’s hand by Bartlett Sher." Chris Jones of The Chicago Tribune called Oslo "the best drama I have seen this year anywhere."

London
The play opened at the Royal National Theatre on 15 September 2017, again directed by Sher, with Toby Stephens, Lydia Leonard, Peter Polycarpou and Philip Arditti as the lead performers, before transferring to the West End's Harold Pinter Theatre from 2 October until 30 December.

Tel Aviv 
The Play opened at the Beit Lessin repertory theater on November 27, 2018, for a limited run of 50 shows.

Repertory
The play ran at Northern Stage in White River Junction, Vermont September/October 2018.

The play ran at the ACT Theater in Seattle, Washington October/November 2018, directed by John Langs, with Avery Clark and Christine Marie Brown as the lead performers.

The play ran at The Lansburgh Theatre in Washington D.C. from April 24 – May 19, 2019, produced by Round House Theatre. Directed by Ryan Rilette.

The play ran at the Bus Barn Theater by the Los Altos Stage Company in Los Altos, CA, January 23 - February 16, 2020. Directed by Gary Landis.

Characters and original cast

Awards and nominations

Original Broadway production

Original West End production

Film adaptation

On November 9, 2020, it was announced that production had commenced on the film version of Oslo, written for the screen by J. T. Rogers and directed by Bartlett Sher, who also directed the Broadway production. Ruth Wilson and Andrew Scott lead the cast. The film premiered on HBO in May 2021.

The film was executive produced by Marc Platt, whose credits include Bridge of Spies, La La Land, and Wicked, as well as by J.T. Rogers, Bartlett Sher, Kristie Macosko Krieger (The Post), Cambra Overend, and Steven Spielberg.

Rogers indicated, in a television interview, that the motion picture might include some details of the story omitted from the play.

References

External links
Internet Broadway Database
Internet Off-Broadway Database

2016 plays
American plays
Broadway plays
West End plays
Plays set in the 1990s
Plays about the Israeli–Palestinian conflict
Cultural depictions of Yasser Arafat
Shimon Peres